Kaifu Temple is a Buddhist temple located in Kaifu District of Changsha City, Hunan province in the People's Republic of China. It includes Entrance, Hall of the Great Heroes, Assisted dnyana, Dining Room, etc. Kaifu Temple belongs to the Yangqi sect and Linji school of Buddhism. The temple is built within a  area of land. For the reason that it was first built earlier than Changsha city, so there is a saying that "there comes first the Kaifu Temple, then the Changsha city".

History

Five dynasties (907–960)
In the late Five Dynasties and Ten Kingdoms period (907–960), Ma Yin (852–930) built a nation named "Chu" (907–951). In 927, Ma Yin's son Ma Xifan (899–947) gave Huichun Park to monk Baoning, Bao Ning built Kaifu Temple.

Song dynasty (960–1279)

In the early Song dynasty (960–1276), eminent monk Hongyun lived here. He was good at medical skills. Emperor Taizu (927–976) granted him a robe. Emperor Taizong (939–997) asked him for some medical prescriptions. Emperor Zhenzong (968–1022) granted him an official position.

In the period of the Emperor Shenzong (1048–1085), monk Zike rebuilt Kaifu Temple.

In the period of the Emperor Huizong (1082–1135), the Japanese monk Juexin came to Kaifu Temple to learn Buddhadharma.

In the late Northern Song dynasty, Kaifu Temple had sixteen scenic spots.

In the Southern Song dynasty, the scholar Zhang Shi (1133–1181) wrote an article talked about Kaifu Temple.

Yuan dynasty (1276–1368)

In Yuan dynasty (1276–1368), Kaifu Temple was destroyed by Mongolian Army.

Ming dynasty (1368–1644)
In the period of the Hongwu Emperor (1368–1398), monk Chedang rebuilt Kaifu Temple.

In the period of the Jiajing Emperor (1522–1566), monk rebuilt Kaifu Temple.

In the late Ming dynasty (1368–1644), Kaifu Temple was destroyed the Qing Dynasty Army.

Qing dynasty (1644–1911)
In the period of the Shunzhi Emperor (1644–1661), monk Foguo rebuilt Kaifu Temple.

During the reign of Kangxi Emperor (1654–1722), Bo Shilong, Zhou Zhaonan, Lang Yongqing and Li Rongzong rebuilt Kaifu Temple.

During the reign of Qianlong Emperor (1736–1796), Liang Guozhi rebuilt Kaifu Temple.

In 1886, in the twelfth year of the age of Guangxu (1875–1908) of Guangxu Emperor (1871–1908), monks Jichan, Liyun and poet Wang Kaiyun organized a literary organization. Liyun built a Buddhist college.

Republic of China (1912–1949)

During the Chinese Civil War, Kaifu Temple was destroyed by the war.

People's Republic of China
In the early People's Republic of China, monk Mingzhen rebuilt Kaifu Temple, but in the Cultural Revolution, many of cultural relics were either stolen or destroyed.

In 1965, Kaifu Temple was listed as a provincial culture and relics site.

In 1983, Kaifu Temple was listed as a National Key Buddhist Temple in Han Chinese Area.

In 1994, the abbot Nengjing built the Monks Dorm, the Free Life Pond, Bell Tower, Drum Tower, rebuilt the Grand Buddha Hall, Meditation Hall, Praying Hall, Monastic Dining Hall, Monastic Reception and the Depositary of Buddhist Texts.

In 2004, Kaifu Temple extended new buildings.

In 2011, the People's Government of Kaifu District extended Kaifu Temple, recovered the sixteen scenic spots.

References

10th-century Buddhist temples
Buddhist temples in Changsha
Temple
Linji school temples
Religious buildings and structures completed in 927